Rustaq is a town and Wilayah (District) in Al Batinah Region of northern Oman. The wilayah is in the Western Hajar Mountains, in the south of the Batinah. Rustaq was once the capital of Oman, during the era of Imam Nasir bin Murshid al Ya'arubi. Rustaq Fort, built four centuries prior to the 7th century CE, is an imposing structure built on three levels, containing separate houses, an armoury, a mosque and four towers.

The Al Hazm Castle is an outstanding example of Omani Islamic architecture and was built in 1711 AD. The fort's roof is built on columns, and contains no wooden supports.

Rustaq is an area of healing warm springs, the most notable being 'Ain al-Kasafa.

There are three popular wadis to visit: Wadi Bani Ghafar, Wadi al-Sahtan and Wadi Bani Auf. In addition, the mountains are pitted with caves such as Al Sanaqha Cave with its own subterranean springs. One of the main occupations in Rustaq is beekeeping. Pure Omani honey is a most sought-after commodity and is of the highest quality. Fruits such as pomegranates, apricots, plums and grapes are grown on the foothills of the Akhdar Mountains and brought to Rustaq for sale.
There are also historical mosques in Rustaq, including the Al-Bayada Mosque, the Basra Mosque and the Qasra Mosque.

Etymology
The name of this town is a derived from the Middle Iranian rōstāg, meaning "district" (also in Baluchi, Persian, Kumzari, etc.), New Iranian rusta, meaning a 'large village.'  The term is a cognate to other Indo-European tongues such as Latin, where 'rustica', means the same thing (whence the source for the English term, 'rustic').

History

During the days of the Sasanian Empire, Al-Rustaq had a Persian marzban (military governor), whom Sasanians in the area would report to. Dibba and Tuwwam, which Oman today shares with the UAE, were taxed by Al-Julanda, who were clients of the Sasanians.
There are also historical mosques in Rustaq, including the Al-Bayada Mosque, the Basra Mosque and the Qasra Mosque.

Economy

Industries
Industries prospered over the years due to the elementary needs of people Al Rustaq and some other states and regions  in Sultanate of Oman. Al Rustaq was made by middle Iranians 40,000 years ago.

Omani Halwa is also produced in Rustaq. People come from many places in the time of Eid and other occasions to buy Halwa. Rustaqi Khanjar production has also been done in Rustaq for a very long time. Old men spend hours and hours making Omani codes. Rustaq people have long been known for their care of palm trees and their dates. They have made use of the branches and leaves to build shelter and make baskets. Leather tanning is also one of the industries in Rustaq. People use leather to save water and food, and for making shoes.

Traditional crafts
 Beekeeping: Rustaq people like beekeeping and many of them own more than 1000 cells.
 Tabseel: it means boiling dates of a specific type "Mabseli" in a particular session.
 Sheep grazing: many people graze animals especially those who live in Wadies and far away from the down town.
 Renewal of guns: Some artisans work in renewal and amendments to the traditional rifles. They upgrade them and add more modifications to improve their functionality.

Traditional arts
 Mashia: it is an introduction to Razhaa.
 Razhaa: art for the men, which started competing in raising the swords.
 Razfah: known locally as Hebiah.
 Azi: comes in the form of song.
 Al-Tareq: This is usually art at the Bedouin living in the north of the state.
 Al-hmpel: This is usually when the Bedouin art and residents east of the state said when moving from one place to another via camels.

Agricultural products

The state is famous for the cultivation of different types of palm including: Khalas, Zabad, Hilali, Al-Mabsli Obo Soih, Almeznaj, Subaa Al-Aroos and Jabri. It is also known for the cultivation of citrus and quince, lemon, Albalnj Alchkak and Nadan, as well as Almstafl and olives (guava), mango (Alamba), bananas and papaya and clover, in addition to seasonal crops such as maize, barley, Algeljlan, onions and garlic.

Sport 
The Rustaq sports complex is the principal sports venue of the city, with a football stadium, indoor stadium, and swimming pool.

See also
 Eastern Arabia

References

External links
 Rustaq.Net

 
Al Batinah South Governorate
Populated places in Oman